Sami Uotila may refer to:

 Sami Uotila (actor) (born 1971), Finnish actor
 Sami Uotila (skier) (born 1976), Finnish former alpine skier

See also 
 Sami (name)